OpenBazaar is an open source project developing a protocol for e-commerce transactions in a fully decentralized marketplace. It uses cryptocurrencies as medium of exchange and was inspired by a hackathon project called DarkMarket.

History 
Amir Taaki and a group of programmers from Bitcoin startup Airbitz created a decentralized marketplace prototype, called "DarkMarket", in April 2014 at a Bitcoin Hackathon in Toronto. DarkMarket was developed as a proof of concept in response to the seizure of the darknet market Silk Road in October 2013. Taaki compared DarkMarket's improvements on Silk Road to BitTorrent's improvements on Napster.

After the hackathon, the original creators abandoned the prototype and it was later adopted and rebranded to OpenBazaar by a new team of developers. On April 4, 2016, OpenBazaar released their first version, which allowed users to buy and sell goods for Bitcoin.

OB1, a for-profit company which had maintained the OpenBazaar repository, a mobile app called Haven, a search engine for stores and several related websites, announced the closure of their servers on January 15, 2021. The project remained active, but with lower development activity. The websites openbazaar.com and openbazaar.org were closed down. A fork of the project, which removed OB1-related elements, was created in 2021. While the desktop client and server daemon retained the OpenBazaar name, the mobile app, for trademark reasons, was renamed Mobazha.

See also 
 InterPlanetary File System
 Tor (anonymity network)

References 

Online marketplaces
Informal economy
Internet properties established in 2014
Software using the MIT license
Free software programmed in Go
Peer-to-peer software